Day & Night is the sixth extended play by South Korean girl group Kara, released on August 18, 2014, with the lead single "Mamma Mia". It marks their first released with new member Heo Youngji after the departure of members Nicole and Jiyoung earlier in the year.

Background
After the departure of Kang Jiyoung and Nicole Jung from the group, DSP Media started a TV show titled Kara Project, a reality TV program which revolves around seven trainees who competed to become the new member of the group. On July 1, 2014, Heo Youngji was proclaimed the winner.  Following her victory, DSP announced plans for the group to release a South Korean album in August before embarking on a concert tour in Japan on October. Producer Duble Sidekick was later announced to be working on the record.

On July 16, it was reported that the group finished the recordings of the mini-album's promotional single music video. On August 1, it was revealed that its title track will also be released as single in Japan after it received good reviews from Japanese affiliates. The full track listing of the single was unveiled on August 8, with "So Good" serving as its B-side.

Composition
The EP consists of six tracks. The first five tracks, including the lead single "Mamma Mia", were composed by Duble Sidekick. The music video was filmed in the Gyonggi Province on July 9. The song will also be released as the group's eleventh Japanese single after it received good reviews from Japanese affiliate label, Universal Sigma. The last track on the album, titled "Story", were co-written by members Park Gyuri, Han Seung Yeon, and Goo Hara.

Promotion
The group held an album showcase on August 18, same day as the EP's release, at UNIQLO-AX Hall and was also aired on channels SBS MTV in South Korea and TBS in Japan on August 24.

Track listing
The track listing was revealed on August 8. A video of the album preview was uploaded on Kara's official YouTube channel.

Release history

Singles

 is the eleventh Japanese single by South Korean girl group Kara and is also taken from their sixth Korean mini-album Day & Night which was released on August 18, 2014. It was released as a single in Japan on August 27 in three editions. This marks the second time that the group has released and promoted a song simultaneously in both South Korea and Japan after "Jumping".

After the departure of Kang Jiyoung and Nicole Jung from the group, DSP Media started a reality TV program  titled Kara Project, which revolves around seven trainees who compete to become the new member of the group. On July 1, 2014, Heo Youngji was proclaimed the winner. Following her victory, DSP announced plans for the group to release a South Korean album in August before embarking on a concert tour in Japan on October. Producer Duble Sidekick was later announced to be working on the group's next album. On August 1, it was revealed that its title track will also be released as single in Japan after it received good reviews from Japanese affiliates. The full track listing of the single was unveiled on August 8, with "So Good" serving as its B-side.

The single cover for the three editions of the single were first released on July 31, 2014.

It was produced by Duble Sidekick and was described as a powerful dance song that "accentuates Kara's unique color". The music video was filmed in the Gyeonggi Province on July 9.

Track listing

Chart performance

Oricon chart

References

External links
 
 Universal Music Japan's KARA website

2014 EPs
Korean-language EPs
Kara (South Korean group) EPs
Kakao M EPs